Boel Flodgren (née Ohlsson), born 17 November 1942 in Örebro, Sweden, is a Swedish professor of business law. Between 1992 and 2003 she was the rector of Lund University. In 2011, she was awarded an honorary doctorate by the University of Oslo.

References 

Academic staff of Lund University
Rectors of Lund University
1942 births
Living people
Swedish legal scholars